Pristurus masirahensis is a species of lizard in the Sphaerodactylidae family found on Masirah Island in Oman.

References

Pristurus
Reptiles described in 2019